Gachi Ferrari is an Argentine is a former model, actress and TV hostess, mostly for children-oriented audiences during the 1970s and 1980s.

Her girl-next-door looks was very popular with advertisers in the 1970s. She was also co-presenter of Telejuegos, El club de Anteojito y Antifaz and El Libro Gordo de Petete, a series of short television programs meant to educate and entertain children.

References
What was of Gachi Ferrari Infobae 
Gachi Ferrari at cinenacional.com 

Argentine female models
Argentine actresses
Year of birth missing (living people)
Place of birth missing (living people)
Living people
21st-century Argentine women